Charles' Aunt is a 1959 Danish comedy film directed by Poul Bang and starring Dirch Passer based on Charley's Aunt.

Cast
 Dirch Passer as Grev Ditlev Lensby
 Ove Sprogøe as Charles Smith
 Ebbe Langberg as Peter Ahlevig
 Ghita Nørby as Laura Hornemann
 Annie Birgit Garde as Lone Hornemann
 Holger Juul Hansen as Ritmester Frederik Ahlevig
 Birgitte Federspiel as Donna Lucia d'Alvadorez / Lise Holm
 Susse Wold as Henriette
 Hans W. Petersen as Etatsråd Ludvig Lohmann
 Keld Markuslund as Butler Olufsen
 Vivi Svendsen as Kokkepigen Kristine
 Børge Møller Grimstrup as Kusken

External links

1959 films
1959 comedy films
Danish comedy films
1950s Danish-language films
Films based on Charley's Aunt
Films directed by Poul Bang
Films scored by Sven Gyldmark
Cross-dressing in film